Yuri Nikiforovich Danilov ;  – 3 February 1937) served as General of the Infantry in the Russian Army during World War I.

From 1907 to 1914, Danilov was in charge of the Intelligence Section of Russian Main Staff of the Imperial Russian Army.

At the start of World War I, Danilov was appointed Quartermaster general for the Imperial Russian Army.  He was known as 'Danilov the Black'.

He was third in command after Grand Duke Nicholas Nikolaevich and his chief of staff Nikolai Yanushkevich.

With the Tsar's decision to take personal command of the army at the front in August 1915, both the Grand Duke and Danilov lost their positions. Appointed to the Northern Front, Danilov served as commander of 25th corps (1915–1916), chief of staff of the Northern Front (1916–1917), and commander of the 5th Army.

After the October Revolution of 1917, he emigrated to Paris, France, where he remained until his death on 3 February 1937.

References

Works 

 Россия в мировой войне 1914—1915 гг. — Берлин, 1924.
 German translation: Russland im Weltkriege, 1914-1915. Jena. 1925.
 French translation: La Russie dans la guerre mondiale (1914-1917). Traduction française d'Alexandre Kaznakov. Payot. 1927
 The Red Army. Foreign Affairs, Vol. 7, No. 1 (Oct., 1928), pp. 96–109.

External links 
 Short biography

1866 births
1937 deaths
Military personnel from Kyiv
People from Kievsky Uyezd
Russian nobility
Imperial Russian Army generals
Historians of World War I
Russian military writers
Russian anti-communists
Russian military personnel of World War I
Recipients of the Order of St. George of the Fourth Degree
Recipients of the Order of St. Vladimir, 3rd class
Recipients of the Order of St. Vladimir, 4th class
Recipients of the Order of St. Anna, 1st class
Recipients of the Order of St. Anna, 3rd class
Recipients of the Order of Saint Stanislaus (Russian), 1st class
Recipients of the Order of Saint Stanislaus (Russian), 2nd class
Recipients of the Order of Saint Stanislaus (Russian), 3rd class
White Russian emigrants to France
Emigrants from the Russian Empire to France